Burton Peter "Burt" Campbell (March 11, 1937 – February 2007) was a Canadian politician. He served in the Legislative Assembly of British Columbia from 1970 to 1972  from the electoral district of Revelstoke-Slocan, a member of the Social Credit Party.

References

British Columbia Social Credit Party MLAs
People from Kamloops
1937 births
2007 deaths